This is a list of notable people with given name Augustine.

 Augustine Albert (1791 – after 1846), French opera singer
 Augustine Baines (1786/87–1843), English religious figure
 Herbert Augustine Carter (1874–1916), English recipient of the Victoria Cross
 Augustine Chacon (1861–1902), Mexican outlaw
 Timothy Augustine Coghlan (1856–1926), Australian statistician
 Augustine De Rothmaler (1859-1942, Belgian pedagogue and feminist
 Joseph Augustine Di Noia (born 1943), American Roman Catholic archbishop and theologian
 Augustine Joseph Hickey Duganne (1823–1884), American poet
 William Augustine Duncan (1811–1885), Scottish journalist and colonial official
 Augustine Eguavoen (born 1965), Nigerian footballer
 Augustine FitzGerald (c. 1765–1834), Irish politician
 Demetrius Augustine Gallitzin (1770–1840), Russian-American aristocrat and Catholic priest
 Augustine Garland (1603–unknown), English lawyer
 Augustine Hailwood (1875–1939), British baker and politician
 John Augustine Hartford (1872–1951), president of the Great Atlantic and Pacific Tea Company
 James Augustine Healy (1830–1900), American Catholic bishop, first African-American bishop
 Augustine Jibrin (born 1988), Nigerian footballer
 Augustine Ngom Jua (1924–1977), Cameroonian politician
 Augustine Kandathil (1874–1956), first Indian Archbishop and first Metropolitan of the Catholic St. Thomas Christians
 Augustine Kelly (1894–1960), Irish cricketer
 Martin Augustine Knapp (1843–1923), United States federal judge
 Augustine Lopez (1935–2013), Tohono Oʼodham Nation tribal chairman in Arizona, United States
 John Augustine Macdonald (1913–1961), Canadian politician
 Augustine Mbara (born 1991), Zimbabwean footballer
 James Augustine McFaul (1850–1917), Irish-American bishop
 Augustine Ofuokwu (1944–2004), Nigerian footballer
 William Augustine Ogden (1841–1897), American composer
 Augustine Paul (1944–2010), Malaysian federal court judge
 Augustine Reding (1625–1692), Swiss Benedictine and theological writer
 Augustine Schoffler (1822–1851), French saint and martyr 
 Augustine Scriven (1852–1916), Anglican priest
 Augustine Tawiah, Ghanaian politician
 Augustine Ukattah (1918–1996), Nigerian teacher and politician
 Augustine Vincent (c. 1584–1626), English herald and antiquary
 Augustine Warner Sr. (1611–1674), English-born Virginia planter and politician
 Augustine Washington (1694-1743), American planter and father of the first U.S. president, George Washington
 John Thornton Augustine Washington (1783–1841), American landowner, farmer, and statesman, member of the Washington family

See also
 Augustin (name), given name and surname
 Augustine (surname)